The World Mountain Running Championships (World Mountain Running Trophy until 2008), is an international mountain running competition contested by athletes of the members of WMRA, World Mountain Running Association, the sport's global governing body.

The championships include a senior men, senior women, junior men and women events and the team events of these races.

It was first held in 1985 as the World Mountain Running Trophy before obtaining its current moniker in 2009.

The 2020 championships, which were scheduled for 13–14 November in Haria, Lanzarote, Spain, were cancelled due to the COVID-19 pandemic.

Editions

Medals

Men

Women

 Italy's Elisa Desco was the original winner of the 2009 women's race but was later disqualified for erythropoietin (EPO).

Men's short race (defunct)

Team winner

Teams
In the team rankings, the score is scored considering the top three ranked for each nation (win the team with score fewer points, giving the score for the place scored). But medals are also assigned to the 4th eventual ranking of each country.

Men

Women

See also
World Long Distance Mountain Running Championships
Commonwealth Mountain and Ultradistance Running Championships
NACAC Mountain Running Championships
European Mountain Running Championships
South American Mountain Running Championships

References

Medalists and editions
World Trophy (1985-2008)/World Championships (2009 on): Results. World Mountain Running Association. Retrieved on 2015-02-04.

External links
Official WMRA website
World Mountain Running Championships at Association of Road Racing Statisticians

 
Mountain running competitions
Mountain running
Recurring sporting events established in 1985